"Get Up 10" is a song recorded by American rapper Cardi B for her debut studio album Invasion of Privacy (2018). The opening number on the album, it was written by Cardi B and Pardison Fontaine, and its producers The Beat Bully, DJ SwanQo and Sean Allen. The song contains interpretations from "Dreams and Nightmares", written by Meek Mill, Maurice Jordan and Jermaine Preyan, therefore they are credited among the composers. It debuted at number 38 on the US Billboard Hot 100 the week following the album's release.

Composition and lyrics
In the lyrics, Cardi B chronicles her rise to prominence, from working at a strip club in New York to her breakthrough in the music industry. For a Vibe editor, it takes influence from Meek Mill's "Dreams and Nightmares" in the "gradual lead in, slowly leading up to a sick bass drop and rapid fire flow about taking over the rap industry."

Critical reception
Jem Aswad of Variety called the song an "empowering opening autobiographical testimonial," and noted it also made room for "clever, piercingly funny lyrics." Andreas Hale in Billboard said, "from the haunting piano opening to the aggressive manner that the song builds momentum, this is the way you welcome listeners to your world and show them that you mean business." Eleanor Halls of GQ considered it the best song on the album. For Kathy Iandoli of XXL, in the "dynamic" intro "Cardi barks with ferocity [...] she leaves the listener with only the ability to focus on her music—gossip blog clickbait to the side."

Live performances
Cardi B gave the first televised performance of the song at the 2018 BET Hip Hop Awards in a medley that also included "Backin' It Up", where she was joined by Pardison Fontaine.

Charts

Certifications

References

External links

2018 songs
Cardi B songs
Songs written by Cardi B
Songs written by Pardison Fontaine
Songs written by Meek Mill